Michael John Rose (born 22 July 1943) is an English former professional footballer who played in the Football League for Charlton Athletic, Mansfield Town and Notts County.  On 21 August 1965, he became the first player to be substituted in the Football League when he was injured after 11 minutes of an away match against Bolton Wanderers and replaced by Keith Peacock.

References

1943 births
Living people
English footballers
Association football goalkeepers
English Football League players
St Albans City F.C. players
Charlton Athletic F.C. players
Notts County F.C. players
Mansfield Town F.C. players
East London United F.C. players
Burton Albion F.C. players